The men's team pursuit cycling event at the 1948 Summer Olympics took place on 7 to 9 August and was one of six events at the 1948 Olympics.

Results

First round
The first round took place on 7 August. The winning team from each heat advanced to the quarterfinals. Since the number of teams made it impossible for the Finnish team to compete against another team, it was determined that their time must beat that of the fastest losing team in the first round to advance to the quarterfinals. Since Australia's 5:06.05 time beat Finland's 5:17.4 time, Australia advanced to the quarterfinals.

Heat 1

Heat 2

Heat 3

Heat 4

Heat 5

Heat 6

Quarterfinals
Heat 1

Heat 2

Heat 3

Heat 4

Semifinals
Heat 1

Heat 2

Final
Gold medal race

Bronze medal race

Final standings

References

External links
Organising Committee for the XIV Olympiad, The (1948). The Official Report of the Organising Committee for the XIV Olympiad. LA84 Foundation. Retrieved 4 September 2016.

Cycling at the 1948 Summer Olympics
Cycling at the Summer Olympics – Men's team pursuit
Track cycling at the 1948 Summer Olympics